Blatni Vrh is a settlement in the Municipality of Laško in eastern Slovenia. The area is part of the traditional region of Styria. It is now included with the rest of the municipality in the Savinja Statistical Region.

References

External links
Blatni Vrh on Geopedia

Populated places in the Municipality of Laško